Aristóbulo del Valle (Misiones) is a village and municipality in Misiones Province in north-eastern Argentina.

The municipality contains part of the Valle del Arroyo Cuña-Pirú Reserve, created in 2000.

References

Populated places in Misiones Province